Xin Xin (born 6 November 1996) is a Chinese swimmer. She competed for China at the 2012 Summer Olympics.

At the 2016 Summer Olympics, she finished 4th in the 10 km marathon.

See also
China at the 2012 Summer Olympics – Swimming

References

External links

1996 births
Living people
Chinese female long-distance swimmers
Swimmers from Shandong
Sportspeople from Jinan
Swimmers at the 2012 Summer Olympics
Swimmers at the 2016 Summer Olympics
Olympic swimmers of China
World Aquatics Championships medalists in open water swimming
21st-century Chinese women